Dakinomyia froggattii is a species of fly in the family Asilidae. Dakinomyia froggattii was described in 1922 by Dakin & Fordham. This species is found in the Australasian realm of Western Australia and South Australia.

References

Asilidae
Insects described in 1922
Arthropods of Western Australia
Fauna of South Australia